Nikhil Chaudhary (born 4 May 1996) is an Indian cricketer. He made his Twenty20 debut for Punjab in the 2016–17 Inter State Twenty-20 Tournament on 29 January 2017.

References

External links
 

1996 births
Living people
Indian cricketers
Punjab, India cricketers
Cricketers from Delhi